The Château de Murol is a castle overlooking the town of Murol in the département of Puy-de-Dôme in the Auvergne-Rhône-Alpes région, France.

History
The first castle was built on a basalt outcrop in the 12th century to provide surveillance over several roads. It was reinforced in the 14th century by Guillaume de Sam, who built the keep, a second chapel and the eastern buildings.

The castle became the property of the d'Estaing family when the sole heir, Jehanne de Murol, married Gaspard d'Estaing in the 15th century. The castle was richly decorated and, under François I d'Estaing, in the 16th century it was surrounded by a huge curtain wall with towers. Emerging unscathed from the sieges during the Catholic League, the castle was transformed when Jean d'Estaing built a more comfortable Renaissance pavilion at the foot of the inner castle. The castle was later abandoned.

Although he ordered the destruction of numerous castles and fortresses, Richelieu spared Murol thanks to the prestige of the d'Estaing family and their influence in the French court. After being used as a prison for many years, it eventually became a bandits' hideout during the Revolution. During the 19th century, it fell to ruin and local inhabitants pillaged the site for stone; its classification as an historical monument (it has been listed as a monument historique by the French Ministry of Culture since 1889) helped to save it and it is now the property of the commune of Murol.

Present day
The castle has been developed as an important tourist site in recent years. The Compagnons de Gabriel organise guided tours and son et lumière shows designed to give a genuine view of life in a medieval castle. Displays of medieval martial arts are given in the lower courtyard.

Entrance through the outer curtain wall is by a fortified gatehouse in the south. The Renaissance Pavilion is in the outer courtyard. Though dilipated, the facade still shows ancient mouldings and pilasters. The inner castle, to the north, boasts 10 m (33 ft) high walls, built on a basalt base. Next to the keep, connected to a smaller tower by a curtain wall, are the two chapels, the older from the 13th century and the other 15th century. A ramp leads to a door, decorated with the arms of the Murol and d'Estaing families, that gives access to the inner courtyard. Still visible are the remains of a gallery, the kitchen, a bakery and several outbuildings.

The curtain walls can be reached up a spiral staircase and it possible to walk all round the ramparts. From the top of the keep the view extends over the town of Murol, the Couze Valley, Lake Chambon, Monts Dore and the Tartaret volcano.

Murol in literature
The ruins of the Château de Murol were described by Guy de Maupassant in his short story "Humble drame" from Contes du jour at de la nuit (1885):

The castle was also described by George Sand in her novel Jean de la Roche (1859).

See also
List of castles in France

References

External links

 Official site 
 Photos of Château de Murol 

Castles in Auvergne-Rhône-Alpes
Monuments historiques of Puy-de-Dôme
Historic house museums in Auvergne-Rhône-Alpes
Museums in Puy-de-Dôme
Guy de Maupassant